Petro Antonovych Zakovorot (1871 – 5 March 1951) was a Ukrainian fencer. Born in Kup'ievakha village, now the Kharkiv region in Ukraine, he competed in the individual masters sabre event at the 1900 Summer Olympics representing Russia, and finished 7th.

References

External links
 

1871 births
1951 deaths
Ukrainian male sabre fencers
Olympic fencers of Russia
Fencers at the 1900 Summer Olympics
People from Kharkov Governorate
Honoured Masters of Sport of the USSR
Russian male sabre fencers
Sportspeople from Kharkiv Oblast